The Sydney School of Education and Social Work is a constituent body of the University of Sydney, Australia. In January 2003, the faculty was formed by the amalgamation of two schools from the former Faculty of Education with the School of Social Work and Policy Studies from the Faculty of Arts.

See also
 Sydney University Education and Social Work Society
 Sydney Teachers College

References

External links
 University of Sydney Faculty of Education and Social Work

Education and Social Work, Faculty of